"Intuition" is a song by American singer Jewel from her fifth studio album, 0304 (2003). The song was written and produced by Jewel and Lester Mendez. It was released on April 7, 2003, as the album's lead single. Following the club success of "Serve the Ego", Jewel shifted to a more pop-oriented sound with the release of "Intuition". The song, which strays from her usual folk style with simple acoustic guitar instrumentation, starts off with a French accordion and then experiments with dance-oriented beats with subtle urban influences, using synthesizers. The song's lyrics contain a number of references to popular culture, including namechecking celebrities such as singer and actress Jennifer Lopez, model Kate Moss, actor Charlie Sheen, magazines, film culture, and commercialism.

"Intuition" achieved moderate success in the United States, reaching number 20 on the Billboard Hot 100. However, a number of Jewel's fans criticized her for abandoning her traditional folk style in exchange for a new pop sound. After the song was licensed to promote Schick Intuition razors, Jewel was accused of "writing a song that tells us all to resist the total marketing mentality... and then licensing that song to a consumer products company for a huge sales campaign."

Background and writing
Inspired by the sudden success of scoring a number-one single on the US Billboard Hot Dance Club Play chart with "Serve the Ego"—the final single from her previous album, This Way—in early November 2002, Jewel decided to make a radical departure from her previous folk-oriented musical efforts and recorded a dance album.

"Intuition" was written and produced by Kilcher and Lester Mendez. It features accordions and dance beats, while she urges listeners to follow their hearts but then taunts, "Sell your sin/Just cash in." In another part of the lyrics, she tries to make sense of her own situation on Intuition: "I'm just a simple girl in a hi-tech digital world... in a world of postmodern fad, what was good now is bad."

The song's usage in a $70 million advertising campaign for Schick razors drew controversy due to the song's message of anti-consumerism. Jewel later noted that the song came about in a "not ideal way" which was "the worst of what the music business is", when her label and her then-management got her involved in the Schick campaign. As part of the deal, Jewel had to write a song titled "Intuition" which was to serve as her first single from 0304, although Schick remarked that the song having the same name as its razor was merely "serendipitous". Jewel felt that the creation process for the song was "inorganic" and that it was hard to make the song authentic, but that she did not feel like "the song was a sell-out" and that she is proud of the song. Jewel attributed changes in the music business and an overall decline in music sales for the necessity of commercial product sponsoring to have a music video produced.

Critical reception
The song received mostly positive reviews from contemporary music critics. Todd Burns from Stylus Magazine wrote that the track is "one of the better singles of the year (2003), Jewel's vamps up the scale demand to be imitated whether lovingly or hatefully. Either way, you're singing along, which is exactly the point."

Versions and commercial performance
The final release of the single saw no alteration from the album version. Radio stations, however, did receive a radio edit of the song, only deleting one repeated chorus verse from the ending of the song cutting it down to three minutes and 13 seconds. Commercial singles were released within the US and internationally. In the US there was a CD single and a CD maxi single release, the former contains "Intuition" and "Standing Still" (Live Acoustic Version) while the latter contains club mixes only. The single reached number 20 on the Billboard Hot 100, while topping the Hot Dance Club Play chart for one week.

Music video

The music video for "Intuition", directed by Marc Klasfeld, was filmed on March 26, 2003 mainly in home video quality but would switch to spoofs of commercials (such as Sprite, Levi's, Nike, and Corona) and female pop stars, with sensationalist images in high quality. The original video was later censored, after a lawsuit by Nike for using the swoosh symbol without permission. In part of the video, a fake TRL ticker-tape reads "Jewel's music sounds much better now that she's dancing!" Jewel noted that the video was supposed to be "ironic and funny", but she felt that the video was misunderstood and that "nobody got it."

Track listings

 US CD single
 "Intuition" – 3:53
 "Standing Still" (live acoustic version) – 4:56

 US maxi-CD single
 "Intuition" (Todd Terry In-House mix) – 5:41
 "Intuition" (Gabriel & Dresden Hi-Tek Digital mix) – 10:50
 "Intuition" (Markus Schulz Coldharbor mix) – 10:21
 "Intuition" (Ford's extended mix) – 7:17
 "Intuition" (Tee's Freeze mix) – 5:39
 "Intuition" (Gabriel & Dresden rhythm club mix) – 8:17
 "Intuition" (Tee's Kat mix) – 6:10
 "Intuition" (Gabriel & Dresden Lo-Tek Analog dub) – 10:30
 Making of "Intuition" music video

 Australian CD single
 "Intuition" (album version)
 "Intuition" (Gabriel & Dresden Hi-Tek digital mix)
 "Intuition" (Tee's Kat dub)
 "Intuition" (Markus Schulz club mix)

 UK CD single
 "Intuition" (album version)
 "Intuition" (Todd Terry In-House mix)
 "Intuition" (Ford's radio mix)
 "Intuition" (Tee's Kat dub)
 "Intuition" (video)

 European CD single
 "Intuition" (album version)
 "Intuition" (Ford's radio mix)

 European maxi-CD single
 "Intuition" (album version)
 "Intuition" (Ford's radio mix)
 "Intuition" (Tee's Kat dub)
 "Intuition" (Markus Schulz club mix)

Charts

Weekly charts

Year-end charts

Certifications

Release history

See also
 List of number-one dance singles of 2003 (U.S.)

References

2003 singles
2003 songs
Atlantic Records singles
Jewel (singer) songs
Music videos directed by Marc Klasfeld
Song recordings produced by Lester Mendez
Songs written by Jewel (singer)
Songs written by Lester Mendez